Sartang is a small language of India. It is one of the Kho-Bwa languages, closest to Sherdukpen (50–60% lexical similarity). Varieties include Sartang of
Jergaon and Sartang of Rahung (Blench 2015).

Distribution
Sartang (Boot Monpa) is spoken in the villages of Khoitam, Rahung, Namku-thangka (Salari), and Boot (Jerigaon) Khoina, West Kameng District (Dondrup 2004:1). There were 2,986 Sartang people as of 1996.

The Ethnologue lists Jerigaon, Sellary, Khoitam, Rahung, Darbu and Khoina villages in Nafra and Dirang circles, West Kameng district.

Varieties
According to Roger Blench (2015), Sartang is a cover term referring to various languages spoken in 11 villages southeast of Dirang in Nafra and Dirang circles in West Kameng District. There are 4 varieties total, and only Sartang of Rahung and Sartang of Jergaon have been documented.

Lieberherr & Bodt (2017) list the following varieties.
Rahung: spoken in Rahung village and nearby hamlets. Approximately 600 speakers.
Khoitam: spoken in two main villages and nearby hamlets. Approximately 500 speakers.
Jerigaon: spoken in Jerigaon village. Approximately 400 speakers.
Khoina: spoken in Khoina village and nearby hamlets. Approximately 500 speakers.

References

Kho-Bwa languages
Languages of India